Near vertical incidence skywave, or NVIS, is a skywave radio-wave propagation path that provides usable signals in the medium distances range — usually . It is used for military and paramilitary communications, broadcasting, especially in the tropics, and by radio amateurs for nearby contacts circumventing line-of-sight barriers. If the frequency is too high (that is, above the critical frequency of the ionospheric F layer), refraction is insufficient to return the signal to earth and if it is too low, absorption in the ionospheric D layer may reduce the signal strength.

There is no fundamental difference between NVIS and conventional skywave propagation; the practical distinction arises solely from different desirable radiation patterns of the antennas (near vertical for NVIS, near horizontal for conventional long-range skywave propagation).

Frequencies and propagation 

The most reliable frequencies for NVIS communications are between 1.8 MHz and 8 MHz. Above 8 MHz, the  probability of success begins to decrease, dropping to near zero at 30 MHz. Usable frequencies are dictated by local ionospheric conditions, which have a strong systematic dependence on geographical location. Common bands used in amateur radio at mid-latitudes are 3.5 MHz at night and 7 MHz during daylight, with experimental use of 5 MHz frequencies. During winter nights at the bottom of the sunspot cycle, the 1.8 MHz band may be required.   Broadcasting uses the tropical broadcast bands between 2.3–5.06 MHz, and the international broadcast bands between 3.9 and 6.2 MHz. Military NVIS communications mostly take place on 2–4 MHz at night, and 5–7 MHz during daylight.

Optimum NVIS frequencies tend to be higher towards the tropics and lower towards the arctic regions. They are also higher during high sunspot activity years. The usable frequencies change from day to night, because sunlight causes the lowest layer of the ionosphere, called the D layer, to increase, causing attenuation of low frequencies during the day  while the maximum usable frequency (MUF) which is the critical frequency of the F layer rises with greater sunlight. Real time maps of the critical frequency are available.  Use of a frequency about 15% below the critical frequency should provide reliable NVIS service. This is sometimes referred to as the optimum working frequency or FOT. 

NVIS is most useful in mountainous areas where line-of-sight propagation is ineffective, or when the communication distance is beyond the  range of groundwave (or the terrain is so rugged and barren that groundwave is not effective), and less than the  range of lower-angle sky-wave propagation. Another interesting aspect of NVIS communication is that direction finding of the sender is more difficult than for ground-wave communication (i.e. VHF or UHF). For broadcasters, NVIS allows coverage of an entire medium-sized country at much lower cost than with VHF (FM), and daytime coverage, similar to mediumwave (AM broadcast) nighttime coverage at lower cost and often with less interference.

Antennas 
An NVIS antenna configuration is a horizontally polarized (parallel with the surface of the earth) radiating element that is from th wavelength (λ) to  wave above the ground. Optimum height is about  wavelength, and high angle radiation declines only slightly for heights up to about  wave. That proximity to the ground forces the majority of the radiation to go straight up. Overall efficiency of the antenna can be increased by placing a ground wire slightly longer than the antenna parallel to and directly underneath the antenna. One source says that a single ground wire can provide antenna gain in the 3–6 dB range. Such a wire 5% longer than the dipole driven element above it. This is a reflector element forming a 2 element yagi beam antenna. The dipole is .15 wavelengths above the reflector element. Said reflector is strung between 2 insulators, touching nothing else. It is inches above the ground, or up to 10 feet (or 3 meters) above the soil, which greatly facilitates mowing the lawn. This antenna is simply a 2 element beam pointed straight up.

Another suitable antenna for NVIS service is the inverted v dipole. It has the advantage of being quickly built.

Another source indicates 2 dB for a single wire and nearly 4 dB for multiple ground wires. Ground wires are more necessary when using lower dipoles over poor soils as without them considerable energy goes into heating the ground.

Depending on the specific requirements, various antennas (i.e. Sloper, T2FD, Dipole) can be used for NVIS communication, with horizontal dipoles or inverted V dipoles at about  wavelength above ground giving the best results on transmit and at about  wavelength on receive, according to military sources and an extensive study by Dutch researchers.
Very low antennas are much inferior on transmit, less so on receive, where both noise and signal are attenuated.

Significant increases in communication will obviously be realized when both the transmitting station and the receiving station use NVIS configuration for their antennas. In particular for low profile operations NVIS antennas are a good option.

For broadcasting, typical antennas consist of a dipole about  wavelength above ground, or arrays of such dipoles. Up to 16 dipoles can be used, allowing strong signals with relatively low power by concentrating the signal in a smaller area. Limiting the coverage may be dictated by licensing, language or political considerations.  Arrays of dipoles can be used to "slew" the pattern, so that the transmitter need not be in the center of the coverage footprint.  Broadcast NVIS antennas usually use an extensive ground screen to increase gain and stabilize the pattern and feed impedance with changing ground moisture.

AS-2259 antenna

A military NVIS antenna is the AS-2259 Antenna, which consists of two ‘V’-shaped dipoles: The four dipole wires also serve as guy rope for the antenna mast. An alternative configuration consists of a transmitting loop antenna which is configured for maximum signal transmission upwards.

See also 
 Refraction

References

External links 
 Analysis of height vs gain
 QSL.net NVIS Article
 Make A Quick, Easy, Cheap, NVIS Antenna for Roadside Operating
 NVIS tutorial

Ionosphere
Radio frequency antenna types
Radio frequency propagation
Antennas (radio)